Histone H1x is a protein that in humans is encoded by the H1FX gene.

Histones are basic nuclear proteins that are responsible for the nucleosome structure of the chromosomal fiber in eukaryotes. Nucleosomes consist of approximately 146 bp of DNA wrapped around a histone octamer composed of pairs of each of the four core histones (H2A, H2B, H3, and H4). The chromatin fiber is further compacted through the interaction of a linker histone, H1, with the DNA between the nucleosomes to form higher order chromatin structures. This gene encodes a member of the histone H1 family.

References

Further reading

External links 
 PDBe-KB provides an overview of all the structure information available in the PDB for Human Histone H1x